Silang may refer to:

People
Diego Silang (1730–1763), Filipino revolutionary leader who sought to establish an independent Ilocano state
Gabriela Silang (1731–1763), first female leader of a Filipino movement for independence from Spain

Places
Silang, Cavite, a municipality in the province of Cavite, Philippines
Bagong Silang, a barangay of Caloocan, Metro Manila, Philippines